The Hip Hop Honors is an annual event that airs on VH1. The television special honors old school and golden age hip hop rappers and contributors for their long-term influence and importance in the history of hip hop culture. It features live performances by most of the honorees along with new artists who have been influenced by them in tribute. The show is taped at the Hammerstein Ballroom in Manhattan, New York City.

Popular hip hop musicians are in attendance include Russell Simmons, Rick Rubin, MC Lyte, Chuck D, Beastie Boys, Common, KRS-One, Flavor Flav, Ice Cube, Dr. Dre, Ice-T, A Tribe Called Quest, Kanye West, Busta Rhymes, Snoop Dogg, Rev Run, Sean "Diddy" Combs, Doug E. Fresh, LL Cool J, Afrika Bambaataa, Wu-Tang Clan, and many more.

The award show is highly valued, above most hip hop award shows who base their honorees off of commercial value. Rather than for their historical significance.

The ceremony returned on July 11, 2016, in honor of the women of hip hop.

1st VH1 Hip Hop Honors (2004)
The first ceremony aired on October 12, 2004, and was hosted by Vivica A. Fox and MC Lyte.

Honorees
 DJ Hollywood
Kool Herc
KRS-One
Public Enemy
Run-DMC
Rock Steady Crew
Sugarhill Gang
2Pac
The Graffiti Movement

Presenters
Roselyn Sanchez
Debbie Harry
Tracy Morgan
Ice-T
Taye Diggs
P. Diddy
Wyclef Jean
Foxy Brown

Performances
Beastie Boys, Mix Master Mike and Doug E. Fresh – "Here We Go" and "Sucker M.C.'s"
Fat Joe and Terror Squad – "Lean Back"
Nas and Olu Dara – "Bridging the Gap" 
Fat Joe – "South Bronx"
Doug E. Fresh, Kid Rock, Kid Capri and Grandmaster Flash – "DJ Medley"
Nas – "Keep Ya Head Up"
Beastie Boys – "Right Right Now Now"
Public Enemy, Beastie Boys, Anthrax – "Black Steel in the Hour of Chaos"/"Fight the Power"/"Bring the Noise"
MC Hammer – "Unconditional Love" (danced and read lyrics from this rap which was originally by 2pac but later given to Hammer as a gift from him that Hammer later did a remake of on his Family Affair album.)
Sugarhill Gang & Chic – "Rapper's Delight"/"Good Times"
Common – On The 88' Tip

2nd VH1 Hip Hop Honors (2005)

The second ceremony aired on September 26, 2005, hosted by Russell Simmons and Rev. Run.

Honorees
Big Daddy Kane
Boyz n the Hood
Grandmaster Flash and the Furious Five
Ice-T
LL Cool J
The Notorious B.I.G.
Salt N Pepa

Presenters
Anthony Anderson
Jerry Ferrara
Spike Lee

Performances
Snoop Dogg – "Warning"
Ice-T – "OG Original Gangster"/"Colors"
Salt N Pepa featuring En Vogue – "Whatta Man" 
Nelly featuring Ciara – "Doin It"
Nelly – "I'm Bad"
LL Cool J – "Mama Said Knock You Out"
Kanye West – "Gold Digger"
Faith Evans, Lil' Cease, Ludacris & Kanye West – "Juicy"/ "One More Chance"/ "Hypnotize"
Common, Black Thought & T.I. – "Raw", "Smooth Operator", & "Set It Off"
Big Daddy Kane – "Warm It Up, Kane"
Diddy & Faith Evans – "I'll Be Missing You"

3rd VH1 Hip Hop Honors (2006)

The third aired on October 17, 2006, with host Ice-T.

Honorees
Afrika Bambaataa
Beastie Boys
Eazy-E
Ice Cube
MC Lyte 
Rakim
Russell Simmons
Wu-Tang Clan

Presenters
KRS-One & Outkast – Afrika Bambaataa
Tracy Morgan – Beastie Boys
Ice Cube & Ice-T- Eazy-E
Mike Epps & Fab 5 Freddy- Ice Cube
Regina King – MC Lyte
Common – Rakim
Diddy – Russell Simmons
Forest Whitaker – Wu-Tang Clan

Performances
Lil' Eazy-E, Young Jeezy, DJ Yella – "We Want Eazy"
Bone Thugs N Harmony – "Tha Crossroads"
Xzibit – "Check Yo Self"
WC – "It Was a Good Day"
Ice Cube – "Why We Thugs"/"Go to Church" w/ Lil Jon
Diddy, Fabolous and Q-Tip – "Hold It, Now Hit It"/"Paul Revere"
Beastie Boys – "So What'cha Want"/"The New Style"
Lil' Kim, Remy Ma, Da Brat, and Yo-Yo – "Cha Cha Cha"/"Kickin' 4 Brooklyn"/"Lyte as a Rock"
MC Lyte – "Paper Thin"/"Ruffneck"
Black Thought, Talib Kweli, Styles P., Raekwon – "Paid In Full"/"Eric B. For President"
Rakim – "Microphone Fiend"/"I Ain't No Joke"
Wu-Tang Clan – "C.R.E.A.M."/"Triumph"
Erykah Badu, George Clinton and the funkadelics
Rakim – It's Nothing

4th VH1 Hip Hop Honors (2007)

The fourth show aired October 8, 2007, and was hosted by Tracy Morgan.

Honorees
A Tribe Called Quest
Missy Elliott 
Snoop Dogg
Whodini
Teddy Riley and Andre Harrell for new jack swing 
Wild Style

Presenters
Kerry Washington – Missy Elliott
P. Diddy and Doug E. Fresh – Andre Harrell and Teddy Riley
LL Cool J – Wild Style
Chris Rock – Whodini
Harvey Keitel – Snoop Dogg
Tracy Morgan – A Tribe Called Quest

Performances
Tweet – "The Rain (Supa Dupa Fly)"
Timbaland & Eve – "Work It"
Eve and Keyshia Cole – "Hot Boyz"
Fatman Scoop and Ciara – "Lose Control"
Nelly Furtado – "Get Ur Freak On (Remix)"
Ne-Yo – "I Like"
T-Pain – "I Want Her" 
Ne-Yo & Keyshia Cole – "Remember The Time"
Kool Moe Dee – "How Ya Like Me Now"
Teddy Riley – "No Diggity"/"Rump Shaker"
Nick Cannon – "Funky Beat"
Nelly – "One Love"
Jermaine Dupri – "Five Minutes of Funk"
Whodini – "Friends" and "Freaks Come Out at Night"
T.I. and B.G. – "Deep Cover"
Pharrell and Daz – "Nuthin' But a 'G' Thang"
Ice-T – "Gin and Juice"
Bow Wow – "Who Am I (What's My Name)"
Snoop Dogg and Pharrell – "Drop It Like It's Hot"
Busta Rhymes, Common, Lupe Fiasco, and Pharrell – "Bonita Applebum"/"Electric Relaxation"/"Scenario" 
A Tribe Called Quest – "Check The Rhime"/"Award Tour"

5th Annual Hip Hop Honors (2008)

The fifth show aired October 6, 2008 and was hosted by Tracy Morgan.

Honorees
Cypress Hill
De La Soul
Naughty By Nature
Slick Rick
Too Short

Presenters
Freddy Rodriguez – Cypress Hill
Joy Bryant – De La Soul
Michael Strahan – Slick Rick
Luke Campbell – Too Short
Eve  – Naughty by Nature

Performances
Fat Joe – "The Phuncky Feel One"
Jim Jones – "I Ain't Goin' Out Like That"
Gym Class Heroes and Mack 10 – "Insane in the Brain"
Cypress Hill – "How I Could Just Kill a Man" / "(Rock) Superstar"
Q-Tip & Estelle – "A Roller Skating Jam Named "Saturdays""
Mos Def & Public Enemy – "Stakes Is High"
Cee-Lo – "Potholes in My Lawn"
EPMD – "Ego Trippin' (Part Two)"
De La Soul and Q-Tip – "Me Myself and I" / "Oooh." / "Buddy"
MC Lyte – "The Ruler's Back"
Busta Rhymes with Spliff Star – "The Show"
Ghostface Killah w/ Biz Markie – "La Di Da Di"
Fabolous and Dana Dane – "Hey Young World"
Eve – "Mona Lisa"
Slick Rick – "Children's Story"
Estelle w/ The Roots – "Ike’s Mood 1"
Mos Def w/ The Roots – "Warning" 
Scarface w/ The Roots – "Mind Playing Tricks on Me"
Public Enemy w/ The Roots – "Black Steel in the Hour of Chaos" 
Kid Rock – "Life Is...Too Short"
Lil Jon – "Shake That Monkey"
Bun B – "Blow the Whistle"
Scarface – "The Ghetto"
Too Short – "Gettin' It" / "Money in the Ghetto"
Wyclef Jean and Juelz Santana – "Everything's Gonna Be Alright"
Big Boi w/ Wyclef Jean – "O.P.P."
Naughty by Nature – "Uptown Anthem" / "Hip Hop Hooray"

6th Annual Hip Hop Honors (2009)

The sixth show aired October 13, 2009 and was hosted by Tracy Morgan.

Honorees
Def Jam Recordings

Presenters
Tracy Morgan
Chris Rock
Anthony Anderson
Jimmy Fallon
Brett Ratner

Performances
Eminem, The Roots, and DJ Jazzy Jeff – "Rock the Bells"
Public Enemy with the Roots, Street Sweeper Social Club and DJ Jazzy Jeff – "Rebel Without a Pause"
Method Man & Redman – "Da Rockwilder"
DMX and Gym Class Heroes – "Party Up (Up in Here)"
Ludacris and Scarface – "Guess Who's Back/Southern Hospitality"
Mary J. Blige and Method Man – "I'll Be There for You/You're All I Need to Get By"
Rick Ross- "Hustlin'"
Warren G and Trey Songz – "Regulate"
Gym Class Heroes, Wale and KRS-One – "No Sleep till Brooklyn"
Ja Rule and Ashanti – "Down 4 U"/"Always on Time"
Onyx – "Slam"
Kid Rock – "I'm Bad"
EPMD – "Crossover"
Foxy Brown and Fabolous – "I'll Be"
Ghostface Killah and Chrisette Michele – "Back Like That"
Wale – "Touch the Sky"

7th VH1 Hip Hop Honors (2010)

The seventh Hip Hop Honors aired on June 7, 2010, hosted by Craig Robinson. The ceremony featured various artists from the 'Dirty South.'

Honorees
2 Live Crew
Luther Campbell
Mr. Mixx
Brother Marquis
Fresh Kid Ice
J. Prince
Jermaine Dupri
Master P
Organized Noise
Timbaland

Presenters
Jonah Hill
Donald Glover
Taraji P. Henson
T.I.
Lauren London
Kelly Rowland
Eddie Griffin
Kid Rock
David Banner
Rozonda "Chilli" Thomas

Performances
Uncle Luke Tribute with DJ Buddha, including a medley of the following songs and performers:
"It’s Your Birthday",” featuring Luther Campbell
"Scarred",” featuring Luther Campbell, Trick Daddy and Pitbull
"I Wanna Rock (Doo Doo Brown)",” featuring Luther Campbell
J. Prince/Rap-a-Lot Tribute with DJ Domination, including a medley of the following songs and performers:
Mind Playing Tricks on Me,” Game and Willie D
Po Pimp,” featuring "A.K".
Nolia Clap,” featuring Juvenile
Get Throwed,” featuring Drake and Bun B
Jermaine Dupri Tribute with DJ Lil Jon, including a medley of the following songs and performers:
I Think They Like Me,” featuring Jermaine Dupri, Dem Franchize Boyz, "Buddie (Gerald Tiller)", "Jizzal Man (Bernard Leverette)", "Parlae" and "Pimpin' (Jamal Willingham)"’
Money Ain't a Thang,” featuring Jermaine Dupri
Jump,” featuring Bow Wow, Jermaine Dupri and Lil Jon
Fresh Azimiz,” featuring Bow Wow, Jermaine Dupri and Lil Jon
Welcome to Atlanta,” featuring P. Diddy and Jermaine Dupri
Master P Tribute with DJ Kid Capri, including a medley of the following songs and performers:
I'm Bout It,” featuring Romeo Miller, "Lil D", "Black Don" and "Valentino"
"That's Cool",” featuring Silkk the Shocker and Trina
I Miss My Homies,” featuring Gucci Mane
Make 'Em Say Uhh!” featuring Mystikal 
Atlanta Medley with DJ Drama, including the following songs and performers:
Wasted,” featuring Gucci Mane
Never Scared,” featuring Bone Crusher
Get Low (song),” featuring Lil Jon, Ying Yang Twins, "Kaine" and "D-Roc"
Timbaland Tribute with DJ Freestyle Steve, including a medley of the following songs and performers:
Big Pimpin,” featuring Bun B
Make Me Better,” featuring Fabolous
The Way I Are,” featuring Keri Hilson, D.O.E. and Sebastian
Get Ur Freak On,” featuring Missy Elliott
Work It,” featuring Missy Elliott
Texas Medley with DJ Michael 5000 Watts, including the following songs and performers:
"Like a Boss",” featuring Slim Thug
Sittin' Sidewayz,” featuring Paul Wall
Ridin',” featuring Chamillionaire
2 Live Crew Tribute with DJ Mixx, including a medley of the following songs and performers:
Me So Horny,” featuring "Fresh Kid Ice" and "Marquis"
"Hoochie Mama",” featuring "Marquis" and "Fresh Kid Ice"
Banned in the U.S.A.,” featuring Uncle Luke
Organized Noize Tribute with DJ Jelly, including a medley of the following songs and performers:
Player's Ball,” featuring "Rico Wade"
Southernplayalisticadillacmuzik,” featuring Nelly, Murphy Lee and "Rico Wade"
Cell Therapy,” featuring Khujo and "Rico Wade"
"Dirty South",” featuring Khujo  and Cool Breeze
So Fresh, So Clean,” featuring Cool Breeze, Sleepy Brown and "Rico Wade"
Saturday (Oooh! Ooooh!),” featuring Asher Roth, "Rico Wade" and Sleepy Brown
Miami Medley with DJ Khaled, including the following songs and performers:
"Million Dollar Girl",” featuring Trina
Low,” featuring Flo Rida
I'm So Hood,” featuring Rick Ross and "DJ Sam Sneed"
Super High,” featuring Rick Ross and "DJ Sam Sneed"
I Know You Want Me,” featuring Pitbull

8th VH1 Hip Hop Honors (2016)
The eighth Hip Hop Honors aired on July 11, 2016 hosted by Eve. This show honored the women of hip-hop.

Honorees
Missy Elliott
Queen Latifah
Salt-N-Pepa
Lil' Kim

Performances
Remy Ma & Fat Joe – All the Way Up
Fantasia, Monica & Tweet – Lady Marmalade
Remy Ma, Nelly Furtado & Trina – Work It
Queen Latifah, MC Lyte, Mia X, Nikki D, Da Brat & Rah Digga – U.N.I.T.Y.
Queen Latifah, Da Brat, Rah Digga, Lady of Rage & Yo-Yo – When You're Good to Mama

Queen Latifah Tribute by Naughty by Nature:
Naughty by Nature – Hip Hop Hooray

9th VH1 Hip Hop Honors (2017)
The ninth and final Hip Hop Honors aired on September 18, 2017 hosted by Regina Hall. This show honored the 90's Game Changers.

Honorees
Mariah Carey
Jermaine Dupri
Martin Lawrence
Master P
Hype Williams

Presenters

DJ Khaled and Asahd Khaled
Kelly Rowland
Keith Powers and Karrueche Tran
T.I.
Pharrell Williams
Tichina Arnold, Affion Crocket, and Lamorne Morris
Ice Cube

Performances

 Missy Elliott – She's A Bitch
 Mariah Carey, Jermaine Dupri, Da Brat, The Lox and Mase – Honey

Mobb Deep Tribute:

 Havoc, Lil' Kim and Fabolous – Quiet Storm

'90s Party Anthems Medley, including the following songs and performers:

Ty Dolla $ign – "This Is How We Do It"
Xscape's Kandi and Tiny – "No Scrubs"
Warren G and Ty Dolla $ign – "Regulate"
Fat Joe and Remy Ma – "Still Not A Player"

Jermaine Dupri & Master P Tribute, including a medley of the following songs and performers:

 Trick Daddy and Trina – "Nann"
 Romeo – "I Got the Hook-Up!"
 Silkk The Shocker and Romeo – "Make Em Say Uhh!"
 Xscape – "Just Kickin' It"

References

External links
Future Hip Hop Legends – listing of eligible hip hop artists

VH1 original programming
American television specials
2004 American television series debuts
2017 American television series endings
Music television specials
Hip hop awards